EKA1 (EPOC Kernel Architecture 1) is the first-generation kernel for the operating system Symbian OS. EKA1 originated in the earlier operating system EPOC. It offers preemptive computer multitasking and memory protection, but no real-time computing guarantees, and a single-threaded device driver model. It was largely been superseded by EKA2.

Much of EKA1 was developed by a single software engineer, Colly Myers, when he was working for Psion Software in the early 1990s. Myers went on to act as CEO for Symbian Ltd., when it was formed to license this kernel and associated operating system to mobile phone makers. He is now CEO of Issuebits Ltd.

See also
Psion (company)

Operating system kernels
Symbian OS
Microkernels
Computer-related introductions in 1989